Leone Emanuele Bardare (born Naples, 1820 – died there after 1874) was an Italian poet. He completed the libretto to Giuseppe Verdi's Il trovatore after the death (in 1852) of its original librettist Salvadore Cammarano. Bardare also crafted a new libretto, titled Clara di Perth, for Rigoletto in an attempt to placate the Neapolitan censors.

References

External links
 

1820 births
Year of death unknown
19th-century Italian poets
Italian male poets
Italian opera librettists
19th-century Neapolitan people
Italian male dramatists and playwrights
19th-century Italian dramatists and playwrights
19th-century Italian male writers